Naumule is a village and former village development committee in Dailekh District of Karnali Province of Nepal. At the time of the 1991 Nepal census it had a population of 1610 people living in 251 individual households.

References

External links
UN map of the municipalities of Dailekh District

Populated places in Dailekh District